John 'Johnny' Cooke (born 17 December 1934 in Bootle) is a former English amateur lightweight and professional light welter/welter/light middle/middleweight boxer.

Amateur career
He was runner-up for the 1958 Amateur Boxing Association of England (ABAE) featherweight title, against Richard McTaggart (Royal Air Force), boxing out of Maple Leaf ABC.

He represented England and won a bronze medal in the -60 Kg division at the 1958 British Empire and Commonwealth Games in Cardiff, Wales. He only lost 16 of 368 recorded contests as an amateur.

Professional career
He made his professional debut on 28 June 1960 and fought in 6 fights until 1963.

Johnny Cooke was managed by Johnny Campbell (circa-1905 — 2 May 1994).

References

External links

Image - Johnny Cooke

1934 births
English male boxers
Middleweight boxers
Lightweight boxers
Light-middleweight boxers
Light-welterweight boxers
Living people
Sportspeople from Bootle
Boxers from Liverpool
Welterweight boxers
Commonwealth Games medallists in boxing
Commonwealth Games bronze medallists for England
Boxers at the 1958 British Empire and Commonwealth Games
Medallists at the 1958 British Empire and Commonwealth Games